Stockert or von Stockert may refer to:

 Ludwig von Stockert
  (born 1940, Vienna), Austrian philologist
 Stockert Radio Telescope, Astropeiler Stockert in the Eifel
 Stockert (hill) in the Eifel

German-language surnames